Canoe Creek is an unincorporated community and census-designated place (CDP) in Frankstown Township, Blair County, Pennsylvania, United States. It is located on U.S. Route 22. It was first listed as a CDP prior to the 2020 census.

Demographics

References

Unincorporated communities in Blair County, Pennsylvania
Unincorporated communities in Pennsylvania
Census-designated places in Blair County, Pennsylvania
Census-designated places in Pennsylvania